Warana may refer to:

 Warana, Maharashtra, India
 Warana, Queensland, Australia

See also
 Warana Raja Maha Vihara, an ancient Buddhist temple in Thihariya, Gampaha District, Sri Lanka